European Tunisians are Tunisians whose ancestry lies within the ethnic groups of Europe, notably the French. Other communities include those from Southern Europe and Northwestern Europe.

Prior to independence, there were 255,000 Europeans in Tunisia in 1956. In 1926, there were 90,000 Italians in Tunisia, compared to 70,000 Frenchmen, despite the fact that Tunisia was a French protectorate, as well as 8,396 Maltese.

History

See also 
Italian Tunisians
European Moroccans
Pied-Noir
Italian settlers in Libya
History of the Jews in Tunisia

Notable people 
 Moufida Bourguiba (1890-1976), first First Lady of Tunisia (1957-1961)

References and footnotes 

Ethnic groups in Tunisia